Roy Engel (September 13, 1913 – December 29, 1980) was an American actor on radio, film, and television. He performed in more than 150 films and almost 800 episodes of television programs.

Career
Engel's ancestry was Irish and Dutch. His father was Roy Engelwood Stults. Engel was a letterman in football Rockhurst High School and Rockhurst College. After he graduated from college, he worked in a warehouse.

Engel's career in radio began at KCMO in Kansas City. His first work on network radio came when he had a role on Jack Armstrong, the All-American Boy. He provided the original voice of the title character on the radio version of Sky King from 1946-1947. His film debut came in D.O.A. (1950).

On television, Engel made eleven appearances in Gunsmoke and had recurring roles as a rancher on The Virginian and as a doctor on Bonanza.

Personal life
Engel was married, and the couple had a daughter, Royan.

Selected filmography

 The Flying Saucer (1950) as Dr. Carl Lawton
 Outrage (1950) as Sheriff Charlie Hanlon
 Chicago Calling (1951) as Pete
 Rogue River (1951) as Ed Colby
 M (1951) as Police Chief Regan
 The Man from Planet X (1951) as Tommy - the Constable
 The Well (1951) as Gleason
 The Sellout (1952) as Sam F. Slaper
 Zombies of the Stratosphere (1952) as Lawson - Boat Charter Operator [Ch. 3]
 Breakdown (1952) as Al Bell
 Strange Fascination (1952) as Mr. Frim
 Jungle Drums of Africa (1953) as First Constable [Chs.7,12]
 The Magnetic Monster (1953) as Gen. Behan
 The Band Wagon (1953) as Reporter (uncredited) 
 Thy Neighbor's Wife (1953)
 The Naked Dawn (1955) as Guntz
 Indestructible Man (1956) as Desk Sergeant
 Frontier Gambler (1956) as Tom McBride
 Three Violent People (1956) as Carpetbagger
 Not of This Earth (1957) as Sgt. Walton
 The Storm Rider (1957) as Major Bonnard
 Escape from San Quentin (1957) as Hap Graham
 Death in Small Doses (1957) as Wally Morse
 The Veil (1958, TV Mini-Series) as Wally Hoffman
 Joy Ride (1958) as Barrett
 A Dog's Best Friend (1959) as Sheriff Dan Murdock
 Gunsmoke (1960) as Grimes in “Don Matteo” (S6E7)
 The Sergeant Was a Lady (1961) as Sgt. Bricker
 The Flight That Disappeared (1961) as Jameson
 My Three Sons (04/12/1962) "Innocents Abroad" as Steve's visiting old friend
 The Virginian (1964 episode "The Intruders") as Barney Wingate
 Your Cheatin' Heart (1964) as Joe Rauch
 Wild Wild West (1967) as General Grant
 Lawman (1971) as Bartender
 The Last Movie (1971) as Harry Anderson
 The Last Child (1971, TV Movie) as Conductor
 Skyjacked (1972) as Pilot
 When the Legends Die (1972) as Sam Turner
 Charley and the Angel (1973) as Driver
 Switchblade Sisters (1975) as Jobo
 The Amazing Howard Hughes (1977, TV Movie) as Production Manager
 Kingdom of the Spiders (1977) as Mayor Connors

Selected Television

References

External links

1913 births
1980 deaths
American male film actors
American male television actors
20th-century American male actors
Deaths from meningitis
Neurological disease deaths in California
Infectious disease deaths in California